In vexillography, the canton is a rectangular emblem placed at the top left of a flag, usually occupying up to a quarter of a flag's area. The canton of a flag may be a flag in its own right. For instance, British ensigns have the Union Jack as their canton, as do their derivatives such as the national flags of Australia and New Zealand.

Following the practice of British ensigns, a canton sometimes contains a symbol of national unity, such as the blue field and white stars of the flag of the United States of America. In these cases, the canton may be called simply the union.

The American flag's canton derives from Britain's use of the Union Jack in the flags of its possessions (including, historically, the Thirteen American Colonies). Subsequently, many New World nations (along with other later countries and regions, such as Liberia or Malaysia) that were inspired by the United States adopted flag elements that were inspired by the American flag. As a result, many extant uses of a prominent canton derive either from British territorial history, or American influence and inspiration.

Current flags using cantons

Sovereign states

Territories, regions, and provinces

Organizations

Former flags that used cantons

States

Territories, organizations, and subdivisions

Canada

Confederate States

France
Many French colonial flags contained the Flag of France in the canton.

Georgia

Serbia and Montenegro

South Africa

United States

Yugoslavia

See also 
 Canton (heraldry)

External links

Flags by design